Patrick Peyton, CSC (January 9, 1909 – June 3, 1992), also known as "The Rosary Priest", was an Irish-born Catholic priest, member of the Congregation of Holy Cross, and founder of the Family Rosary Crusade. He popularized the phrases "The family that prays together stays together" and "A world at prayer is a world at peace."

Peyton staged massive Rosary rallies in key cities of the world and extensively utilized mass communication, helped by world-recognized celebrities of Hollywood at that time, promoting his ministry of binding families through prayer under the Family Rosary. Peyton was a popular and charismatic figure in Latin America and the Philippines, where he promoted the Rosary and was known for his strong Irish accent.

His cause for canonization was opened in 2001 and Pope Francis declared him Venerable on December 18, 2017.

Biography

Early life 
Peyton was born Patrick Joseph Peyton in Attymass, County Mayo, Ireland, to subsistence farmers John and Mary Gillard Peyton. Peyton was the sixth in a profoundly religious family of four girls and five boys living in a small cottage on a  stony farmland near the foot of the Ox Mountains. Later on, some members of the family migrated to the United States.

Peyton was sent to his mother's relatives in Bonniconlon, County Mayo to study at a school run by Tadhg O’Leary in Bofield. As a young man, Peyton was rebellious and had moments of defying authority, resulting in dropping out of school. Despite the youthful rebellion, he remained close to his family and deeply religious.

By his teen years, he was contemplating a vocation to become a priest. Although religious recruiters such as the Capuchins and the Redemptorist fathers visited Carracastle in search of young men wanting to pursue the priesthood, Peyton concentrated on helping his family earn a living when their father became too ill to work the farm. Some of his elder sisters were already in America and sent remittances to help the family left in Ireland. In 1927, his sisters sent word that Patrick and his older brother Thomas could sail to the United States and join them in Scranton, Pennsylvania. On May 13, 1928, nineteen-year-old Patrick and his brother set sail.

America 
The brothers arrived in New York after a 10-day trip, traveling by steerage. The two took the train from New York to Pennsylvania and lived at the home of their already married sister Beatrice, who was working as a housekeeper for Thomas J. Baldrige, the state Attorney General. Peyton's sister Nellie had already spoken to Monsignor Paul Kelly of Saint Peter's Cathedral and mentioned Peyton's interest in pursuing a priestly vocation. Monsignor Kelly told Nellie to bring her younger brother Patrick to the cathedral as soon as he arrived. By June 1928, with hard luck in finding a job, Peyton finally met Monsignor Kelly and was offered a position of becoming the cathedral's sexton. In the words of Peyton at that time, "a sexton was just another name for a janitor."

Peyton took the job with initial hesitation, but his daily presence at the cathedral brought back the calling for a vocation, and he finally decided to pursue the priesthood. Monsignor Kelly insisted that Peyton complete his high school education before admission to the novitiate. He and his older brother Thomas both pursued their religious vocations while working at the cathedral. During the spring of 1929, Father Pat Dolan of the Congregation of Holy Cross came to the cathedral in Scranton in search of new seminarians. Peyton and his brother Thomas entered the minor seminary of the Congregation of Holy Cross in Notre Dame, Indiana.

After completing their high school studies at the Holy Cross School in Notre Dame, Indiana, Peyton was admitted to the Moreau Seminary within the University of Notre Dame in 1932, where he pursued a Bachelor of Arts degree, and excelled in Philosophy. He credited Cornelius Hagerty, a professor of ethics, as the one who provided him with counseling. As a young seminarian, Peyton was attracted to become a Holy Cross Father for the order's focus on the Holy Family and towards obedience and conscience.

Marian devotion 

In October 1938, during Peyton's second year of theology at Catholic University of America, he was diagnosed with tuberculosis. He was transferred back to Notre Dame to the Infirmary. Father Cornelius Hagerty was influential in this stage of Peyton's life, encouraging the young seminarian to seek the Blessed Virgin Mary's help. The doctors discovered that the patches in his lungs disappeared.

He immediately packed his bags and left for Washington, D.C., to complete his theology studies and take his final vows. On June 15, 1941, Peyton and his brother Thomas were ordained at the Basilica of the Sacred Heart at the University of Notre Dame as members of the Congregation of Holy Cross.

Lifetime crusade 

Peyton was given very light duties following the completion of his theological studies. His first assignment was in Albany, New York, as the chaplain of the Holy Cross Brothers of the Vincentian Institute. Peyton started sending letters to bishops, the Catholic laity, and other groups promoting the importance of families praying the Rosary as the war raged on.

Utilizing radio, films, outdoor advertising, and later television, with the help of celebrities, artists, and advertising practitioners, Peyton was one of the first pioneers of evangelism using mass media. He would also pioneer in conducting public rallies to bring families to pledge to pray the Rosary as a unit. These Rosary rallies attended by millions would become the most significant event where Peyton could be best remembered.  According to historian Hugh Wilford, "Peyton himself was deeply conscious of the political dimension of his mission, proudly proclaiming in a 1946 radio broadcast, 'The rosary is the offensive weapon that will destroy Communism—the great evil that seeks to destroy the faith.'"

These Rosary Crusades were duplicated in different dioceses, with attendees growing in numbers. They took Peyton around the globe to locales including Brussels, Belgium, Madrid, Spain, Manila, Philippines, New Zealand, Papua New Guinea, Lima, Peru and Rio de Janeiro in Brazil. With the help of a non-Catholic advertising practitioner, Peyton would popularize the slogan, "The family that prays together stays together." During the Marian year of 1954, Peyton brought the Rosary Crusade to Ireland "...where it was estimated that as many as 445,000 people attended his rallies."

Death 

With the Cold War threatening new world peace, Peyton's work in promoting prayer was recognized by the Holy See. His efforts earned him the title "The Rosary Priest."

Controversy hounded Peyton throughout his ministry as some accused him of being a front for American intelligence during his missions in Latin America. Peyton's Rosary Crusades in Latin America were funded and, to some extent, directed by the Central Intelligence Agency, which was interested in combating leftist political movements in Latin America. This came about through Peyton's connection to J. Peter Grace, the great-grandson of the founder of W.R. Grace and Company, a multinational corporation with interests in transport, sugar, and mining in South America. Peyton had met J. Peter Grace in 1946 on a trans-Atlantic voyage. Grace, who was involved with other CIA front operations as well, wrote to John Moore, the chair of the Business Advisory Council, and the two men approached Allen Dulles. Dulles later met with Grace in the White House office of Vice President Richard Nixon, who expressed enthusiasm. The CIA decided for several years where the crusades would take place. CIA funds were expended in Chile, Brazil, Venezuela, and Colombia, until Peyton's provincial superior, Richard H. Sullivan, learned of the secret funding from Theodore Hesburgh, the chair of the board of trustees of the University of Notre Dame, in October 1964. It took the Vatican more than a year and a half to oblige Peyton to give up his CIA financing. While the CIA determined the Crusades' locations, it did not influence the content or Peyton's goal of promoting family prayer – the Rosary and devotion to the Blessed Mother.

Others accused Peyton of living a flashy lifestyle amongst Hollywood artists who volunteered their efforts to promote his mission. But Peyton maintained that he never solicited funds for his ministry, and the well-off were more than generous to voluntarily donate a portion of their wealth all in the name of the Blessed Mother.

Peyton died peacefully on June 3, 1992, holding a rosary in a small room at the Little Sisters of the Poor Jeanne Jugan Residence in San Pedro, California. His remains were brought to the Holy Cross Cemetery on the grounds of Stonehill College in Easton, Massachusetts.

Before Peyton died, he continued to work on what was to be the last major Rosary Rally. On December 8, 1992, at the Rizal Park in Manila, Philippines, Manila Archbishop Cardinal Jaime Sin led the celebrations for the Golden Jubilee Celebration of the Family Rosary Crusade; the Archbishop of Los Angeles, Cardinal Roger Mahony was sent as Papal Legate on behalf of Pope John Paul II. Among Filipino Catholics, Peyton is remembered for his Sunday televised shows, where he promoted the Rosary and Marian devotion along with his famous slogan. Peyton also encouraged many businesses to make and sell large amounts of Rosaries for distribution, which he gave freely to impoverished Filipinos living in the slums.

Legacy 
Peyton's work continues today in his original ministries – Family Rosary, Family Theater, and Family Rosary International – and the Father Patrick Peyton Family Institute.

On October 9, 2020, Family Theater Productions released a biographical film about Peyton. Father David Guffey is the national director of Family Theater Productions and a member of the Holy Cross religious institute that Peyton belonged to. Guffey is the executive producer of the film, entitled Pray: The Story of Patrick Peyton.

Sainthood cause 
Cardinal Seán Patrick O'Malley announced a formal declaration, opening the cause for sainthood of Father Peyton on June 1, 2001, a few days after receiving approval from the Vatican's Congregation for the Causes of the Saints. The declaration paved the way for the process of determining Peyton's holiness, and in the process earning the revered title of "Servant of God."

The Positio was sent to the C.C.S. in 2015 for assessment, and theologians approved his cause on June 1, 2017. Pope Francis named him as Venerable on December 18, 2017.

References

Sources
 .
 .
 .
 .
 .
 .
 "Fifty Golden Years of the Family Rosary Crusade in the Philippines (1951-2001)" written by Father James B. Reuter, SJ; Gennie Q. Jota; Dean M. Bernardo, edited by Stella J. Villegas 2001 Family Rosary Crusade Foundation, Inc. © 2001
 Wilford, Hugh. The Mighty Wurlitzer: How the CIA Played America.  Cambridge and London: Harvard University Press, 2008.

External links
 Father Patrick Peyton, C.S.C. - Memorial Website
 Museum of Mayo
 Family Rosary
 Family Theater Productions
 Pray: The Story of Patrick Peyton
 Father Peyton Memorial Center
 Family Rosary Crusade - Philippines

1909 births
1992 deaths
20th-century American Roman Catholic priests
20th-century Irish Roman Catholic priests
20th-century venerated Christians
American venerated Catholics
Businesspeople from Scranton, Pennsylvania
Catholic Mariology
Catholic television
Congregation of Holy Cross
Evangelists
Irish Servants of God
Irish anti-communists
Irish emigrants to the United States
Irish film producers
Irish radio producers
Irish television producers
Religious leaders from County Mayo
Roman Catholic writers
Television evangelists
University of Notre Dame people
Venerated Catholics by Pope Francis